Stephen Yau may refer to:

 Stephen Shing-Toung Yau (born 1952), American mathematician
 Stephen Sik-Sang Yau, American computer scientist